"Tú eres un bom bom" (Spanish for "you are a bom bom") is a song recorded by Panamanian singer Kafu Banton, released for digital download and streaming on May 24, 2019. It was written by Kafu Banton, DJ Blass and Mista Greenzz, and produced by the latter two.

Music video
The accompanying music video for "Tú eres un bom bom" was released on October 9, 2019, 21:00 EST. The video was directed by Lucho Spada. It was filmed in Playa Escondida, Colón, Panama.

Credits and personnel
 Kafu Banton – vocals, songwriting
 DJ Blass – songwriting, production
 Mista Greenzz – songwriting, production

Other versions

Bad Gyal remix

On April 9, 2020, Kafu Banton released a remix of "Tú eres un bom bom" along with Spanish singer Bad Gyal.

Background and release
Bad Gyal reached Kafu Banton through producers DJ Blass and Mista Greenzz, with whom she had previously worked. In December 2019, Bad Gyal posted a snippet of the song to an Instagram story. "Tú eres un bom bom (remix)" was released for digital download and streaming by Aftercluv on April 9, 2020.

Music video
The accompanying music video for "Tú eres un bom bom (remix)" was released along with the song on April 9, 2020, 23:00 CET, on Bad Gyal's YouTube channel. The video was produced by Pandora, and directed by Laura Vifer.

Controversy
Shortly after the song release, Bad Gyal was criticized for collaborating with Kafu Banton, whom some people referred to as homophobic because of "Pato", a song recorded in the early 2000s in which he talks about physically assaulting gay men. Before the release of the song, Bad Gyal had stated in multiple times that "I would never work with a sexist or homophobic person".

On April 12, Bad Gyal released a statement to an Instagram story, apologizing "to those who felt offended [or] disappointed for my collaboration with Kafu", and noted that, "I didn't know this song existed... My team and I should have informed more [about Kafu Banton's career]." In an interview with Shangay on April 22, Bad Gyal stated that she would give 50% of her profits with the song to Nuevos Horizontes, a Panamanian LGBT association.

On April 13, Kafu Banton posted a statement on Instagram, saying that "Pato"—which was included in the 2018 reissue of his greatest hits album The Best of Me: Saben Quién Soy—"was a song written and produced more than 20 years ago at the beginning of my career, which did not have the maturity, nor the orientation that I maintain today. I am faithful to my ideals and I fight for social justice."

Charts

Certifications

Credits and personnel
Credits adapted from Tidal and other sources.

 Kafu Banton – vocals, songwriting
 Bad Gyal – featured artist, vocals, songwriting
 DJ Blass – songwriting, production
 Mista Greenzz – songwriting, production
 El Guincho – songwriting, production
 Paul Lorant – artwork

Bad Gyal and Guaynaa remix

On May 15, 2020, Kafu Banton released a remix of "Tú eres un bom bom" along with Spanish singer Bad Gyal and Puerto Rican singer Guaynaa. The song was released along with a lyric video, published on Bad Gyal's YouTube channel.

Credits and personnel
Credits adapted from Tidal and other sources.

 Kafu Banton – vocals, songwriting
 Bad Gyal – featured artist, vocals, songwriting
 Guaynaa – featured artist, songwriting
 DJ Blass – songwriting, production
 Mista Greenzz – songwriting, production
 El Guincho – songwriting, production
 Paul Lorant – artwork

Release history

References

2019 singles
2019 songs
2020 singles
Bad Gyal songs
Male–female vocal duets
Music controversies
Music videos shot in Panama
Songs written by el Guincho
Song recordings produced by el Guincho
Spanish-language songs
Universal Music Group singles